Arturia is a French electronics company founded in 1999 and based in Grenoble, France. The company designs and manufactures audio interfaces and electronic musical instruments, including software synthesizers, drum machines, analog synthesizers, digital synthesizers, MIDI controllers, sequencers, and mobile apps.

History

Arturia was founded in 1999 in Grenoble by INPG engineers Frédéric Brun and Gilles Pommereuil to create affordable software synthesizers. The first product they developed was Storm, a virtual instrument workstation. The close emulation of classic analog synthesizers helped the company gain popularity in its market. In order to create sounds with minimal digital artifacts, Brun and Pommereuil developed new software algorithms to eliminate these issues.

In 2003, using the algorithms they had developed, Arturia worked with Robert Moog to create the Modular V softsynth. The Modular V uses Arturia's True Analog Emulation (TAE) in an attempt to faithfully reproduce the oscillators, filters, and other modules from the Moog 3C and Moog 55. Following these releases, Arturia continued to develop software emulations of well-known synthesizers, including the ARP 2600, Roland Jupiter-8, Minimoog, and Sequential Circuits Prophet-5.To this day Arturia is still developing software synthesizers and effects bundled respectively in the V Collection and FX Collection which are updated every year.

In 2007, Arturia combined sounds from several of their softsynth titles into Analog Factory, which offered 2000 preset synthesizer patches, offering this the following year as Analog Experience, a hybrid system which combined the software with a MIDI keyboard controller specifically designed to play and control it.

Arturia entered the hardware synthesizer market in 2009 with the Arturia Origin and followed up in 2012 with the MiniBrute, a vintage-style 25-key monophonic analog synthesizer with one voltage controlled oscillator, two low-frequency oscillators, and a multi-mode Steiner-Parker filter. The synthesizer was introduced at the 2012 NAMM Show. Despite pre-production uncertainty about sales, the MiniBrute sold well due to its low price point and expressive sound. In the following year, Arturia announced their next hardware synthesizer, the MicroBrute, a smaller and less expensive version of the MiniBrute with minikeys, a patch bank, and a sequencer. Both synthesizers received critical acclaim.

In 2015, Arturia launched the AudioFuse. A compact 2-input audio interface with dense connectivity. This was the start of a new line of products which now includes bigger-scale audio interfaces such as the AudioFuse studio, the AudioFuse 8pre and the updated version of the AudioFuse. In 2021, Arturia announced a more affordable line of audio interfaces called MiniFuse, with different number of inputs and colour formats.

Released in 2016 as a part of the Brute family, the Drum Brute is an analog drum machine with a dedicated sequencer. With 17 drum engines, the DrumBrute is known to have a very distinctive sound. Two years later Arturia released the DrumBrute Impact, a shrunk down and reworked version of the DrumBrute with a possibility to add accent to sounds which changes the timbre of each engine.

In January, 2018, they introduced MiniBrute 2. This semi-modular analog synth includes its own tiny patch bay that connects to Eurorack modular gear. They also introduced the MiniBrute 2S which swaps a traditional keyboard for performance pads and a sequencer, more powerful than the MiniBrute 2, that can be recorded in real time.
	
Released in 2019, MicroFreak is an unusual-looking synthesizer based on a digital oscillator, an analog filter and a touch capacitive keyboard. The digital oscillator allows for different algorithms to be loaded onto the unit, such as physical modelling from mutable instruments or frequency modulation from noise engineering. In 2022, Arturia released the MiniFreak, a polyphonic version of the MicroFreak with a couple more functionalities and a mini key keyboard.

In 2020, Arturia released the PolyBrute, its flagship 6-voice-polyphonic analog synthesiser. Its layout is reminiscent of its monophonic counterpart, the MatrixBrute, and shares the same analog architecture as other analog synthesisers from Arturia's Brute range. In addition it features a touchstrip over the keyboard and a multidimensional touchpad called “morphée” which allows more control over the sound.
In 2016, Arturia released the KeyStep. An entry level 32-note keyboard, acclaimed for its sequencing capabilities and its all round connectivity. This led Arturia to further this line now including the KeyStep pro released on Namm 2020, the BeatStep Pro and the KeyStep 37.

Products
The company's product line includes software synthesizers, software bundles, hardware synthesizers, MIDI keyboards and sequencers, mobile apps, and other audio equipment and controllers.

Software synths
In December 2018, Arturia released their very first original software synthesizer called Arturia Pigments. It has similarities to the popular VST plug-ins Serum and Vital, which is visualising real-time time signatures of envelopes, filter, LFOs and wavetables.

Arturia's previous software synths are emulations of other synthesizers, organs, and pianos, and are available to buy individually or all together in the V Collection. Arturia's Analog Lab is a collection of presets of these synths with limited sound modeling available and comes bundled with many of their Keyboard Midi controllers, including the KeyLab MkII and KeyLab Essential series.

In 2022, Arturia released, as part of their V Collection 9, a new line of original serines of products including Augmented STRINGS and Augmented VOICES. These virtual instruments aim to bring new approaches to already known sounds. As of original virtual effects, rev intensity, delay eternity, buss force, efx fragments, coldfire are all part of FX Collection.

Subtractive synthesis 
 MS-20 V, a recreation of the MS-20 from Korg
 ARP2600 V3, a recreation of the Arp2600 from ARP instruments
 CS-80 V4, a recreation of the CS80, made by Yamaha
 Mini V3, a recreation of the Minimoog, made by Moog
 Modular V3, a recreation of the Moog modular synthesizer, made by Moog
 SEM V2, a recreation of the SEM, made by Oberheim
 Jup-8 V4, a recreation of the Jupiter 8, made by Roland
 Matrix-12 V2, a recreation of the Matrix 12, made by Oberheim
 Synthi V, a recreation of the VCS 3, made by EMS
 Jun-6 V, a recreation of the Juno-60, made by Roland 
 OP-Xa V, a recreation of the OB-X by Oberheim
 Prophet V, a recreation of the Prophet-5 by Sequential

Digital synths 
DX7 V, a recreation of the DX7 by Yamaha
 SQ80 V, a crosswave synth that combines waveforms
CZ V, a phase distortion synth based on the CZ-101 and CZ-1000 made by Casio

Keyboard emulations 
 VOX Continental V2, a recreation of the Vox Continental organ by Vox
 Farfisa V, a recreation of a Farfisa Organ
 Wurli V2, a recreation of the Wurlitzer electronic piano by Wurlitzer
 Solina V2, a recreation of the ARP String Ensemble, made by ARP Instruments
 Stage-73 V2, a recreation of the range of Rhodes electronic pianos, made by Rhodes
 Clavinet V, a recreation of the Clavinet by Hohner
 B-3 V2, an organ recreation
 Piano V3, recreates the sound of a piano via physical modelling

Samplers 
 Emulator II V, a recreation of the E-mu Emulator, made by E-mu
 Synclavier V, a recreation of the Synclavier by New England Digital
 CMI V, a recreation of the Fairlight CMI, made by Fairlight
 Mellotron V, a recreation of the Mellotron

Miscellaneous plug-ins 
 Analog Lab V
 Pigments, original VSTi with wavetable, virtual analog, sample and harmonic engines.
 Buchla Easel V, a recreation of the Music Easel by Buchla
Vocoder V, a vocoder emulation.
 Prophet-5V, a vector synthesis plug-in based on the Prophet VS, made by Sequential Circuits
 KORG MS-20 V, a recreation of the MS-20 synth by Korg
 Augmented Strings 
 Augmented Voices
 Augmented Grand Piano

Software effects

Filters 
Mini-Filter, a filter emulation of Moog's ladder filter with sequencing and modulation sources added
 M12-Filter, a filter emulation of Oberheim Matrix-12 filter, based on the CEM 3372 with sequencing and modulation sources added
 SEM-Filter, a filter emulation of Oberheim SEM filter with sequencing and modulation sources added
 EQ SITRAL-295, an emulation of the Siemens Sitral equalisers

Dynamics 
Comp VCA-65, a VCA-style compressor emulating the DBX 165A
 Comp FET-76, an emulation of the 1176LN made originally by Universal Audio
 Comp TUBE-STA, a tube-style compressor
 Bus force, a bus effects unit made by Arturia combining an equaliser a compressor and a distortion unit

Time-based effects 
Chorus JUN-6, an emulation of the chorus unit of the Juno-60 originally made by Roland
 Chorus DIMENSION-D, an emulation of Dimension-D, a chorus unit Originally made by Roland
 Phaser BI-TRON, a recreation of the Bi-Phase originally made by Mu-tron
 Flanger BL-20, a recreation of the BF-20 Flanger originally made by Bel

Reverbs and delays 
Delay TAPE-201, a tape-style delay emulating the Roland's RE-201
 Delay MEMORY-BRIGADE, a bucket brigade style delay based on Electro-Harmonix's Deluxe Memory Man
 Delay ETERNITY, a digital delay designed by Arturia
 Rev PLATE-140, a plate-style reverb, emulating the EMT 140 by EMT
 Rev INTENSITY, a digital reverb designed by Arturia
 Rev SPRING-636, a spring-style reverb emulating Grampian's reverberation unit type 636
 Efx Fragments, a granular effect designed by Arturia

Preamplifiers 
Pre 1973, a recreation of the AMS Neve preamp with a pair of parametric equalizers.
 Pre TridA, a recreation of the preamps and the equalizers found in the Trident's A range consol
 Pre V76, a recreation of Telefunken's equalizers and preamplifiers
 Tape MELLO-FI, a tape style preamp/saturation module emulating characteristics of Mellotron V

Audio interfaces
 MiniFuse 1
 MiniFuse 2
 MiniFuse 4
 AudioFuse
 AudioFuse Studio
 AudioFuse 8PRE

MIDI controllers

 KeyStep
 KeyStep 37
 KeyStep Pro
 BeatStep (discontinued)
 BeatStep Pro
 MiniLab MK III
 MicroLab
 KeyLab Essential 49
 KeyLab Essential 61
 KeyLab Essential 88
 KeyLab 49 MK II
 KeyLab 61 MK II
 KeyLab 88 (discontinued)
 KeyLab 88 MK II

Hardware synths

While Arturia is mostly known for their software synths, Arturia is also making hardware synthesizers, including their popular Brute series.

 MicroFreak
 MicroBrute
 MiniFreak
 MiniBrute
 MiniBrute 2
 MiniBrute 2S
 MatrixBrute
 Origin
PolyBrute

Hardware drum machines
 DrumBrute
 DrumBrute Impact

Hybrid drum machines (Windows/Mac OS X/iOS with controller)
 Spark
 SparkLE

iOS Apps 
 iMini
 iSem
 iProphet
 iSpark

References

External links

Frederic Brun Interview NAMM Oral History Library (2021)

French companies established in 1999
Electronics companies established in 1999
Companies based in Auvergne-Rhône-Alpes
Synthesizer manufacturing companies of France
Software synthesizers
MIDI
Musical instrument manufacturing companies of France
Organizations based in Grenoble
French brands